This is a list of islands of the Faroe Islands. There are 18 islands, of which Lítla Dímun is the only one uninhabited. Besides these 18 islands there are also several islets and skerries in the Faroes.

See also

Geography of the Faroe Islands
Subdivisions of the Faroe Islands

References

Faroe Islands
 
Islands